Imbricaria bellulavaria is a species of sea snail, a marine gastropod mollusc in the family Mitridae.

Description
The length of the shell varies between 34 mm and 48 mm.

Distribution
This marine species occurs off the Philippines.

References

  Dekkers A.M., Herrmann M., Poppe G.T. & Tagaro S.P. (2014) Three new species of Subcancilla from the Pacific Ocean (Gastropoda: Mitridae). Visaya 4(2): 39-48

External links
 Worms Link
 Fedosov A., Puillandre N., Herrmann M., Kantor Yu., Oliverio M., Dgebuadze P., Modica M.V. & Bouchet P. (2018). The collapse of Mitra: molecular systematics and morphology of the Mitridae (Gastropoda: Neogastropoda). Zoological Journal of the Linnean Society. 183(2): 253-337

Mitridae